The Ecuadorian small-eared shrew (Cryptotis equatoris) is a species of shrew in the family Soricidae. It is found on the western and eastern slopes of the Andes in central Ecuador.

References

Cryptotis
Mammals of Ecuador
Mammals of the Andes
Mammals described in 1912
Taxa named by Oldfield Thomas